This uniform polyhedron compound is a composition of 5 great icosahedra, in the same arrangement as in the compound of 5 icosahedra.

The triangles in this compound decompose into two orbits under action of the symmetry group: 40 of the triangles lie in coplanar pairs in icosahedral planes, while the other 60 lie in unique planes.

References 
.

Polyhedral compounds